Suroso (born Sidoarjo, East Java, 24 April 1981) is an Indonesian footballer who plays for Bhayangkara F.C. He normally plays as a defender and is 178 cm tall. In 2006, he helped Persik Kediri win the Liga Indonesia Premier Division. He also played for Arema Malang in the 2007 AFC Champions League group stage, where he was sent off in a match against Bangkok University FC.

He has played with football clubs or teams with a home base in East Java, because he does not want to be far away from his family.  Now, he stays in Lamongan and  plays for club Persela Lamongan.

Career 
He signed with Arema Cronus on 9 December 2014.

Honours

Club
Persik Kediri

 Liga Indonesia: 2006

Bhayangkara

 Liga 1: 2017

References

External links 
 

Indonesian footballers
1981 births
Living people
People from Sidoarjo Regency
Sportspeople from East Java
Persik Kediri players
Persema Malang players
Persebaya Surabaya players
Deltras F.C. players
Arema F.C. players
Persela Lamongan players
Bhayangkara F.C. players
Liga 1 (Indonesia) players
Association football defenders